Ansty and Staplefield, previously Cuckfield Rural, is a civil parish in the Mid Sussex District of West Sussex, England, covering an area from the north-west side of Burgess Hill, the whole lying around but mostly to the west of Cuckfield civil parish, from which it was created in 1894 under the Local Government Act 1894. It includes the settlements of Ansty in the south, Staplefield to the north-west and Brook Street to the north-east.

Landmarks include Borde Hill Garden, and Tyes Place, an historic mansion.

References

External links
 Parish Council web site

Civil parishes in West Sussex
Mid Sussex District